Hecate is the name of a fictional deity appearing in American comic books published by Marvel Comics, based on the Greek goddess who had the same name. Created by Chris Claremont and Sal Buscema, she first appeared in Ms. Marvel #11 (1977).

Publication history
Hecate made her first appearance in Ms. Marvel #11 in 1977. The character has since made several appearances in various Marvel Comics titles.

Fictional character biography
In the Marvel Comics universe, Hecate is among the Titans who ruled the ancient world that Zeus spares when he deposes them and conquers Olympus, and becomes Olympus' resident Goddess of Magic. She is the first deity to give magic to mortals, in defiance of Zeus who had forbidden the gods from meddling with humans. Zeus later exiles her from Olympus, wiping her memories and stripping her of her powers.

Hecate appears on Earth, claiming to be an extra-dimensional explorer, mistaken for Hecate on a visit to the planet some millennia prior. At one point she fights Ms. Marvel.

At some point, she loses more of her memories and becomes an inmate of the Raft. During the Fear Itself storyline, Hecate is among the Raft inmates who escape after Juggernaut in the form of Kuurth: Breaker of Stone levels it. She assists Basilisk, Griffin, and Man-Bull in a bank robbery until Hercules arrives and recognizes her. Hecate shortly regains her memories, recovers her godly abilities, and decides to take over Brooklyn, reshaping the borough to resemble a monster-infested Ancient Greece. Hercules kills her ally Kyknos and she flees as Brooklyn returns to its normal state.

Some time later, the Scarlet Witch seeks out Hecate after sensing a disturbance in witchcraft. She finds her operating a café on a Greek island and asks for her help. Hecate explains that she is content to remain uninvolved with the world of witchcraft, but mentions that there is a magical disturbance on the island, which could support Wanda's theory that magic is broken. She asks Wanda to defeat a Minotaur that has been murdering islanders, and the heroine discovers that the Emerald Warlock, a century-old mage, had forcibly transformed Man-Bull to do his bidding.

Powers and abilities
During her exile, Hecate was solely capable of shapeshifting, projecting energy bolts, and bringing images from others' minds to life.

When her memories returned, Hecate regained her Olympian characteristics, which include superhuman strength (lifting 25 tons), durability, speed, and endurance. She is also immortal and un-aging, immune to all human ailments and diseases. As the Olympian goddess of magic, Hecate is an extremely powerful sorceress and has been invoked by mortal magic users in the casting of spells. She can release powerful energy blasts, read thoughts, shape-shift, and alter the form of other people and objects. Her skill in magic is so great that when she warped reality around Brooklyn and its inhabitants, she did so without depending on external sources for increased magical power. She also has some influence over dogs and her presence alone causes all canines in a certain radius around her to become vicious.

Alternate versions
A human mutant character named Hecat'e appears in XSE #1 (Nov. 1996), created by John Ostrander and Chris Gardner. This character can project darkness from her left eye.

References

External links
 
 

Characters created by Chris Claremont
Characters created by Sal Buscema
Classical mythology in Marvel Comics
Comics characters introduced in 1977
Fictional characters with superhuman durability or invulnerability
Fictional goddesses
Fictional illusionists
Greek and Roman deities in fiction
Hecate
Marvel Comics characters who are shapeshifters
Marvel Comics characters who can move at superhuman speeds
Marvel Comics characters who use magic
Marvel Comics characters with superhuman strength
Marvel Comics deities
Marvel Comics female characters